Y Para Siempre (Eng.: "And Forever") is the twelfth studio album released by Los Bukis on July 1, 1989. This release includes nine songs written by Marco Antonio Solís, who also produced the album. The three singles yielded from this album peaked within the Top 20 in the Billboard Hot Latin Tracks chart: "A Donde Vayas", "Me Dió Coraje", and the number-one song "Cómo Fuí a Enamorarme de Tí". Como Fui a Enamorarme de Ti was also the name of the movie starring Los Bukis.

Track listing

All songs written and composed by Marco Antonio Solís except for Dime Que Si

Personnel
Marco Antonio Solís — arranger, producer, realization
Los Bukis — arranger
Sergio Garcia — engineer
Pancho Gilardi — design, photography
Adriana Rebold — Graphic design, art direction

Chart performance

Album

Singles

References

1989 albums
Los Bukis albums
Fonovisa Records albums